"Light On" is a 2008 song by American Idol winner David Cook.

Light On may also refer to:
"Light On" (Rebecca Ferguson song), a 2013 single
Light On (album), a 2007 jazz album by Tom Harrell
"Light On" (Maggie Rogers song), 2018 single from the album Heard It in a Past Life

See also
Lights On (disambiguation)